The Chambal Division is an administrative geographical unit of Madhya Pradesh state of India. A river by the name Chambal, a tributary of Yamuna River, forms the boundary between Rajasthan and Madhya Pradesh, in the upper part of the Chambal Division. Morena is the administrative headquarters of the division. As of 2012, the division consists of the three districts of Bhind district, Morena and Sheopur.

The current Divisional Commissioner of this division is Shri. Ashish Saxena , IAS 2003 batch MP Cadre. He also holds the  additional charge of Chambal Division. Smt.Renu Tiwari IAS 2000  batch was the first female commissioner of the division.

References

Divisions of Madhya Pradesh
Morena